Ilarja Zarka (born 1 October 2001) is an Albanian footballer who plays as a midfielder for Vllaznia and the Albania national team.

International career
Zarka made her debut for the Albania national team on 9 April 2021, coming on as a substitute for Arbenita Curraj against Bosnia and Herzegovina.

See also
List of Albania women's international footballers

References

2001 births
Living people
Women's association football midfielders
Albanian women's footballers
Albania women's international footballers
Sportspeople from Fier
KFF Vllaznia Shkodër players